Netball at the Pacific Games (previously known as the South Pacific Games) has been played by women's netball teams from Pacific nations since 1963. It is the oldest Oceania regional tournament.

Pacific Games

Pacific Mini Games

See also
Netball at the Commonwealth Games
Oceania Netball Federation

Notes

References

Sources

 
Pacific Games
Pacific
Pacific Games